Rigi Kaltbad is a resort in the Swiss Alps, located in the canton of Lucerne. The locality is part of the municipality of Weggis.

Rigi Kaltbad is located on the flanks of the Rigi and is connected to Vitznau by the Rigi Railways. It is also connected to Weggis by a cable car.

Rigi Kaltbad was also the terminus of the Rigi–Scheidegg railway, a contour-following panoramic rail line that connected it to the Scheidegg summit between 1875 and 1931.

References

External links

Villages in Switzerland
Ski areas and resorts in Switzerland
Geography of the canton of Lucerne
Car-free villages in Switzerland